was a prefecture in the Chūbu region of Japan, comprising the former state of Mikawa and the Chita Peninsula. It was merged into Aichi Prefecture on November 27, 1872.

Former prefectures of Japan